Coleophora laniella is a moth of the family Coleophoridae. It is found on the island of Honshu in Japan.

The wingspan is about 12.5 mm.

References

laniella
Moths described in 1990
Moths of Japan